The Worcester Range is a mountain range in Antarctica standing between the Skelton and Mulock Glaciers on the western side of the Ross Ice Shelf. Probably named after the training ship in the Thames, in which many officers of early British Antarctic expeditions trained. Discovered by the British National Antarctic Expedition (BrNAE), 1901–04. The name seems to have been first applied on the charts of the British Antarctic Expedition, 1907–09.

The range is part of the Prince Albert-McMurdo Range, which also includes the Prince Albert Mountains, in the Victoria Land region of New Zealand's Ross Dependency claim.  These ranges are part of the larger Transantarctic Mountains, which span the continent.

The highest peak in the range is Mount Harmsworth, a prominent ice-covered peak, at the NW side of the head of Delta Glacier. Discovered by the BrNAE and named for Sir Alfred Harmsworth, later Viscount Northcliffe, a generous contributor to the expedition.

Other notable peaks include Mount Marks (~2600m), named after Rodney Marks, and Portal Mountain (2555m).

See also
Jensen Rampart

References

Mountain ranges of the Ross Dependency
Hillary Coast